Carl A. Parker (born August 6, 1934) is an American politician. He served as a Democratic member in the Texas House of Representatives from 1962 to 1977 and in the State Senate from 1977 to 1995. His tenure of service included time as Speaker Pro Tempore of the House and President Pro Tempore of the State Senate.

In 1979, Parker was a member of the Killer Bees, the group of twelve quorum-busting Democratic senators that hid out in an Austin garage apartment for 4½ days.

References

1934 births
Living people
Democratic Party members of the Texas House of Representatives
People from Port Arthur, Texas
University of Texas School of Law alumni